Nimishangal is a 1986 Indian Malayalam-language film, directed by Radhakrishnan (RK). The film stars Mohanlal, Jagathy Sreekumar, Captain Raju and Shankar. The film has musical score by MB Sreenivasan.

Cast

Mohanlal  as Murali
Shankar as  Ravi
Nalini as  Maya
Shanthi Krishna as Anitha
Jagathy Sreekumar
Captain Raju as Khalid
Maniyanpilla Raju as Joseph
Achankunju
Chithra
Adoor Bhavani
Alummoodan as Kesava Pillai (PC)
Disco Shanti
Jagannatha Varma as Divan Bahdoor Rajapathmanabhan Thamby
Janardanan as  Damodaran Pilla (SI)
Kundara Johnny as Vijayan
Lalithasree as Doctor Shekhar's Wife
Lalu Alex
P. K. Abraham

Soundtrack
The music was composed by M. B. Sreenivasan and the lyrics were written by P. Bhaskaran.

References

External links
 

1986 films
1980s Malayalam-language films